Hold Up is a 1974 Italian film starring Frederick Stafford and Nathalie Delon.

References

External links

1974 films
Italian crime thriller films
1970s Italian films